The Uzbek Ambassador in Beijing is the official representative of the Government in Tashkent to the Government of the People's Republic of China.

List of representatives

References 

China
Uzbekistan